Buenos Aires a la vista is a 1950 Argentine musical drama film directed and written by Luis Bayón Herrera with Carlos A. Petit. The tango film premiered on September 20, 1950 in Buenos Aires.

Cast
Dorita Acosta
Blanquita Amaro
Francisco Audenino
Carlos Castro
Rafael Chumbito
Miguel Dante
Dringue Farías
Ramón Garay
Carlos A. Gordillo
Agustín Irusta (actor)
Oscar Llompart
Lalo Malcolm
Vicente Rubino
Adolfo Stray

References

External links
 

1950 films
1950s Spanish-language films
Tango films
Films directed by Luis Bayón Herrera
Films set in Buenos Aires
1950s musical drama films
1950s dance films
1950 drama films
Argentine musical drama films
Argentine black-and-white films
1950s Argentine films